Panhandle is the county seat of Carson County, Texas, United States. The population of the town was 2,452 at the 2010 census. Panhandle is part of the Amarillo metropolitan statistical area.

History
Panhandle derives its name from its central location in the Texas Panhandle. Originally named "Carson City", it was later changed to "Panhandle City".

In 1887, Panhandle obtained a post office, and in 1888, the town was planned as the terminus of the Panhandle and Santa Fe Railway.  At that time, the town was surrounded by several large cattle ranches. The community soon acquired a bank, a mercantile store, a wagonyard, a school, a newspaper, and three saloons.

In 1888, Carson County was organized, and Panhandle became the county seat. The area's cattlemen were reconciled to the arrival of farmers because they produced needed forage crops, such as hay, and introduced more families with eligible young women for the cowboy bachelors of the cattle kingdom.

Panhandle was scandalized in 1897 after George E. Morrison, a preacher at the Methodist Episcopal Church, poisoned his wife Minnie with a strychnine-laced apple so that he could marry his mistress Miss Annie Whittlesey of Topeka, Kansas. Morrison was sentenced to die in the gallows at Vernon in Wilbarger County, Texas, his last words being: "Jesus, Lover of My Soul".

In 1909, Panhandle voted to incorporate with a mayor-council government.

The population grew in the 1920s when Panhandle became the center of a natural gas field.

A new county courthouse was completed in 1950.

Panhandle continued to thrive in the 1980s as a regional marketing and shipping center for cattle, wheat, and petroleum products.

The Carson County Square House Museum is located inside the oldest house in Panhandle, and is listed on the National Register of Historic Places.

Demographics

2020 census

As of the 2020 United States census, there were 2,378 people, 1,058 households, and 723 families residing in the town.

2000 census
As of the census of 2000,  2,589 people, 945 households, and 719 families were residing in the town. The population density was 1,216.6 people/sq mi (469.3/km2). The 1,014 housing units averaged 476.5/sq mi (183.8/km2). The racial makeup of the town was 93.16% White, 0.66% African American, 0.77% Native American, 0.08% Asian, 3.86% from other races, and 1.47% from two or more races. Hispanics or Latinos of any race were 8.96% of the population.

Of the 945 households,  38.2% had children under 18 living with them, 64.0% were married couples living together, 9.2% had a female householder with no husband present, and 23.9% were not families. About 22.4% of all households were made up of individuals, and 12.5% had someone living alone who was 65  or older. The average household size was 2.63, and the average family size was 3.10.

In the town, the population was spread out, with 29.4% under the age of 18, 5.9% from 18 to 24, 26.4% from 25 to 44, 21.4% from 45 to 64, and 17.0% who were 65 years of age or older. The median age was 38 years. For every 100 females, there were 90.6 males. For every 100 females age 18 and over, there were 86.1 males.

The median income for a household in the town was $41,686, and for a family was $50,735. Males had a median income of $38,155 versus $25,329 for females. The per capita income for the town was $21,640. About 4.0% of families and 6.7% of the population were below the poverty line, including 7.1% of those under 18 and 11.4% of those age 65 or over.

Geography and climate
Panhandle is located slightly south of the center of Carson County. U.S. Route 60 passes through the town, leading northeast  to Pampa and southwest the same distance to Amarillo. Texas State Highway 207 crosses US 60 in Panhandle and passes through the center of town; it leads north  to Borger and south  to Interstate 40 at Conway.

Climate
According to the Köppen climate classification system, the Panhandle has a semiarid climate, BSk on climate maps.

Education
The Town of Panhandle is served by the Panhandle Independent School District and is home to the Panhandle High School Panthers and Pantherettes.

References

External links

 City of Panhandle official website
 Panhandle Independent School District
 Square House Museum

Towns in Carson County, Texas
Towns in Texas
County seats in Texas
Towns in Amarillo metropolitan area